Pygmalion is a 1948 British TV production of the 1913 play by George Bernard Shaw. It was the first time the play was done for television and was the longest production done by the BBC to that time.

It starred Margaret Lockwood who was under suspension by the Rank Organisation at the time for refusing a film role.

Cast
Ralph Michael as Professor Henry Higgins
Margaret Lockwood as Eliza Doolittle
Arthur Wontner as Colonel Pickering
Gordon Harker as Alfred Doolittle
Helen Cherry as Clara Eynsford-Hill
Mary Merrall as Mrs. Eynsford-Hill
Bryan Coleman as Freddie Eynsford-Hill
Beatrice Varley as Mrs. Pearce

Reception
The production was very well received. It was voted best TV production of the year and Lockwood voted Best Actress.

It was Lockwood's first play on TV and she wrote in her memoirs that "I loved every moment of Pygmalion. After the performance I was like a beginner again waiting nervously for the papers, bracing myself to read the criticism. I had not felt this way about notices since I first went on the stage. Thank goodness they were good ones. I was generously praised."

Lockwood later toured with the play on stage.

References

External links

Pygmalion at BBC

1948 in British television
British television plays
1940s television plays